The Federation of Indian Student Associations (FISA) in Australia was incorporated in 2002  by Gautam Gupta after he was the victim of a drunken assault which led to depression and his decision to start the federation. Since the Violence against Indians in Australia controversy began, the FISA has had a high profile in many Australian, Indian, and other international sources.
 
FISA's stated purpose is; 
Integration: To unify Indian students in Australia and integrate them with the Australian community at large.
Representation: To partner at all levels of the Australian political and social spectrum to represent views and opinions of Indian students.
Empowerment: To increase the spiritual, political, social and economic strength of Indian students in Australia.

FISA's aims are;
 FISA to be recognised as a point of reference for Indian students nationally.
 To construct an effective and long lasting communication network amongst students who are Indian by pedigree.
 The network would consist of all University Unions/Organisations and other like-minded associations, representative bodies and interested individuals.
 Organise events to provide a social interaction point for students.
 Increase dialogue between other community representative bodies to provide students a perspective of multicultural Australia.
 FISA Executives consist of dynamic Indians and Australians from various cultures whose primary aim is to form a synthesis of multicultural society.

References 

Indian-Australian culture and history
Students' unions in Australia
Indian S